Parvathipuram was a Lok Sabha constituency in north-eastern Andhra Pradesh till 2008. The seat was reserved for the Scheduled Tribes.

Members of Parliament

Election results

2004

See also
 Parvathipuram, Andhra Pradesh
 List of Constituencies of the Lok Sabha

References

Former Lok Sabha constituencies of Andhra Pradesh
Former constituencies of the Lok Sabha
2008 disestablishments in India
Constituencies disestablished in 2008
Vizianagaram district